George P. Pelecanos (born February 18, 1957) is an American author. Many of his 20 books are in the genre of detective fiction and set primarily in his hometown of Washington, D.C. He is also a film and television producer and a television writer. On television, he frequently collaborates with David Simon, writing multiple episodes of Simon's HBO series The Wire and Treme, and is also the co-creator (with Simon) of the HBO series The Deuce and We Own This City.

Early life
Pelecanos, a Greek American, was born in Washington, D.C. in 1957.

Career

Novelist
Pelecanos acknowledged that Elmore Leonard was a prime influence on him as an author. In addition to Leonard, he cited the works of Dashiell Hammett, Raymond Chandler, John D. MacDonald, Ross Macdonald, Mickey Spillane, and John le Carré for getting him hooked on crime fiction.

Pelecanos's early novels were written in the first person voice of Nick Stefanos, a Greek D.C. resident and sometime private investigator.

After the success of his first four novels, the Stefanos-narrated A Firing Offense, Nick's Trip, and Down by the River Where the Dead Men Go, and the non-series (though some characters do cross over) Shoedog, Pelecanos switched his narrative style considerably and expanded the scope of his fiction with his D.C. Quartet. He has commented that he did not feel he had the ability to be this ambitious earlier in his career. The quartet, often compared to James Ellroy's L.A. Quartet, spanned several decades and communities within the changing population of Washington. Now writing in the third person, Pelecanos relegated Stefanos to a supporting character and introduced his first "salt and pepper" team of crime fighters, Dimitri Karras and Marcus Clay.

In The Big Blowdown, set a generation before Karras and Clay would appear (the 1950s), Pelecanos followed the lives of dozens of D.C. residents, tracking the challenges and changes that the second half of the twentieth century presented to Washingtonians. King Suckerman, set in the 1970s and generally regarded as the fans' favorite, introduced the recurring theme of basketball in Pelecanos' fiction. Typically, he employs the sport as a symbol of cooperation amongst the races, suggesting the dynamism of D.C. as reflective of the good will generated by multi-ethnic pick up games. However, he also indulges the reverse of the equation, wherein the basketball court becomes the site of unresolved hostilities. In such cases, violent criminal behavior typically emerges amongst the participants, usually escalating the mystery. The Sweet Forever (1980s) and Shame the Devil (1990s) closed the quartet and Pelecanos retired Stefanos and the other characters that populated the novels. (Stefanos and other characters do reappear in subsequent works).

In 2001, he introduced a new team of private detectives, Derek Strange and Terry Quinn, as the protagonists of Right as Rain. They have subsequently starred in the author's more recent works Hell to Pay (which won a Gumshoe Award in 2003) and Soul Circus. While these books have cemented the author's reputation as one of the best current American crime writers and sold consistently, they have not garnered the critical and cult affection his D.C. quartet did. Rather, they seem to be continuing the author's well received formula of witty protagonists chasing unconflicted criminals behind the backdrop of popular culture references and D.C. landmarks.

Perhaps sensing this, Pelecanos again switched his focus in his 2004 novel, Hard Revolution, taking one of his new detectives, Derek Strange, back in time to his early days on the D.C. police force. In another interesting move, Pelecanos attached a CD to the book itself, emulating Michael Connelly who included a CD with his 2003 Harry Bosch book Lost Light.

In 2005, Pelecanos saw another novel published, Drama City. This book revisited the examination of dogfighting begun in his book Hell To Pay. Pelecanos is a dog owner and has written about his views of dogfighting.

In 2006 he published The Night Gardener, which was a major change of style and which featured a cameo of himself. Pelecanos has also published short fiction in a variety of anthologies and magazines, including Measures of Poison and Usual Suspects. His reviews have been published in The Washington Post Book World, The New York Times Book Review, and elsewhere.

The Turnaround was published in August 2008, reflecting a return to his roots, as the novel opens in the 70s in a Greek diner, and a continuation of his more modern style in the portion set in the present. The Turnaround won the 2008's Hammett Prize.

In 2011, Pelecanos published The Cut, introducing the character Spero Lucas, a young veteran of the Iraq war. The former Marine works part-time as a private investigator for a D.C. defense attorney as well as taking jobs finding stolen items for a 40% cut of the value of the returned item. In 2013, Pelecanos published The Double, the second Spero Lucas book.

Pelecanos has in turn influenced other novelists. They include Kristen Lepionka, who won the Shamus Award for Best First P.I. Novel in 2018. Lepionka cited his "lean, laconic prose." The introduction to a 2018 interview with William Boyle pointed to Pelecanos's influence on Boyle, in particular as a "meticulous chronicler of process."

Film and television
Pelecanos has written and produced for HBO's The Wire and is part of a literary circle with The Wire creator David Simon and novelist Laura Lippman. Simon sought out Pelecanos after reading his work. Simon was recommended his novels several times but did not read his work initially because of territorial prejudice; Simon is from Baltimore. Once Simon received further recommendations, including one from Lippman, he tried The Sweet Forever and changed his mind. The two writers have much in common including a childhood in Silver Spring, Maryland, attendance at the University of Maryland, and their interest in the "fate of the American city and the black urban poor". They first met at the funeral of a mutual friend shortly after Simon delivered the pilot episode. Simon pitched Pelecanos the idea of The Wire as a novel for television about the American city as Pelecanos drove him home. Pelecanos was excited about the prospect of writing something more than simple mystery for television as he strived to exceed the boundaries of genre in his novels.

Pelecanos joined the crew as a writer for the first season in 2002. He wrote the teleplay for the season's penultimate episode, "Cleaning Up", from a story by Simon and Ed Burns. Pelecanos was promoted to producer for the second season in 2003. He wrote the teleplay for the episodes "Duck and Cover" and "Bad Dreams" from stories he co-wrote with Simon. He remained a writer and producer for the third season in 2004. He wrote the teleplay for the episodes "Hamsterdam" and "Middle Ground" from stories he co-wrote with Simon. Simon wrote the teleplay for the episode "Slapstick" from a story he co-wrote with Pelecanos. Simon and Pelecanos' collaboration on "Middle Ground" received the show's first Emmy Award nomination, in the category Outstanding Writing for a Drama Series. Pelecanos left the production staff of The Wire after the show's third season to concentrate on writing his novel The Night Gardener. His role as a producer was taken on by Eric Overmyer.

Pelecanos remained a writer for the fourth season in 2006. He wrote the teleplay for the penultimate episode "That's Got His Own" from a story he co-wrote with producer Ed Burns. Simon has commented that he missed having Pelecanos working on the show full-time but was a fan of The Night Gardener. Simon also spent time embedded with a homicide unit while researching his own book Homicide: A Year on the Killing Streets. Pelecanos and the writing staff won the Writers Guild of America (WGA) Award for Best Dramatic Series at the February 2008 ceremony and the 2007 Edgar Award for Best Television Feature/Mini-Series Teleplay for their work on the fourth season. Pelecanos returned as a writer for the series fifth and final season. He wrote the teleplay for the episode "Late Editions" from a story he co-wrote with Simon. Pelecanos and the writing staff were again nominated for the WGA award for Best Dramatic Series at the February 2009 ceremony for their work on the fifth season but Mad Men won the award.

Following the conclusion of The Wire Pelecanos joined the crew of the HBO World War II mini-series The Pacific as a co-producer and writer. After a lengthy production process the series aired in 2010. He co-wrote "Part 3" of the series with fellow co-producer Michelle Ashford. The episode focused on Marines on leave in Australia and featured a displaced Greek family in a prominent guest role. Pelecanos saw the project as a chance to make a tribute to his father, Pete Pelecanos, who served as a Marine in the Philippines.

Also in 2010 Pelecanos joined the crew of HBO New Orleans drama Treme as a writer. The series was created by Simon and Overmeyer. It follows the lives of residents of the Tremé neighborhood after Hurricane Katrina. Pelecanos wrote the teleplay for the episode "At the Foot of Canal Street" from a story he co-wrote with Overmyer. Pelecanos returned as a Consulting Producer and writer for the second season in 2011. He joined the crew full-time as a writer and executive producer for the third season in 2012. He remained in this role for the fourth and final season in 2013.

Following the conclusion of Treme Pelecanos worked with Overmyer on his next series Bosch. The series was developed by Overmyer and is based on the series of novels by Michael Connelly. The series stars The Wire alumni Jamie Hector and Lance Reddick. Pelecanos and Michael Connelly co-wrote the show's fourth episode "Fugazi".

In 2017, HBO premiered The Deuce, a new series developed by Pelecanos and David Simon. The show focuses on the birth of the pornography industry in 1970s Times Square. George also co-authored several of the teleplays, including the pilot, with Simon, and co-authored episodes with Richard Price and Lisa Lutz.

In 2019, Pelecanos' D.C. Noir anthology was made into a film featuring several short fictional crime stories which take place in Washington, D.C. Pelecanos wrote the film and also served as a director and executive producer. The film was shot on location in Washington, D.C. and is reminiscent of HBO's The Wire.

He is currently developing a series based on his Derek Strange character for HBO. The first season will be based on the Derek Strange novel Hard Revolution. More recently, he signed an overall deal with HBO.

Personal life
As of 2006, Pelecanos lives in the Washington, D.C. suburb of Silver Spring, Maryland with his wife and three children.

Bibliography

Novels

Standalone novels
Shoedog (1994). 
Drama City (2005). 
The Night Gardener (2006). 
The Turnaround (2008). 
The Way Home (2009). 
The Man Who Came Uptown (2018)

Nick Stefanos series
A Firing Offense (1992). 
Nick's Trip (1993). 
Down by the River Where the Dead Men Go (1995).

D.C. Quartet series
The Big Blowdown (1996). 
King Suckerman (1997). 
The Sweet Forever (1998). 
Shame the Devil (2000).

Derek Strange and Terry Quinn series
Right as Rain (2001). 
Hell to Pay (2002). 
Soul Circus (2003). 
Hard Revolution (2004). 
What It Was (2012).

Spero Lucas series
The Cut (2011). 
The Double (2013).

Short fiction

Collections
The Martini Shot (2015).

Edited anthologies
D.C. Noir (2006). 
D.C. Noir 2: The Classics (2008). 
Best American Mystery Stories 2008, with Otto Penzler (2008).

Essays, reporting and other contributions

Filmography
Production staff

Writer

Awards

References

External links

George P. Pelecanos at the Internet Book List

1957 births
Living people
20th-century American novelists
21st-century American novelists
American male novelists
American male screenwriters
American mystery writers
American television producers
American television writers
American writers of Greek descent
Barry Award winners
American male television writers
Maltese Falcon Award winners
People from Silver Spring, Maryland
The New Yorker people
University of Maryland, College Park alumni
Novelists from Maryland
Novelists from Washington, D.C.
Writers Guild of America Award winners
20th-century American male writers
21st-century American male writers
Screenwriters from Maryland
Screenwriters from Washington, D.C.